iViZ Security is an information security company which is into on-demand application penetration testing for proactive security audit risk management and compliance for standards such as SOX, PCI, HIPAA and ISO 27001:2005.

The company was founded by Bikash Barai and Nilanjan De in 2005 and funded by IDG Ventures. The company got acquired by Cigital Inc in 2014.

Software as a Service (SaaS) Offerings 
 Application Penetration Testing
 Network and System Penetration Testing
 Payment Card Industry (PCI) Scan
 Compliance Reporting
 Mobile Application Security Testing

References

 US-based security firm Cigital acquires Bangalore-based firm iViZ Security
 Power of Ideas: iViz draws on human psychology to provide network protection
 Your Antivirus can be a Door for Hackers: iViZ "Green Cloud Security" Discovers New Vulnerabilities in AVG, Sophos, F-Secure etc.
 iViZ discovers new vulnerabilities in anti-virus software
 Your antivirus can be a door for hackers
 Protecting the security that guards computer networks
 NASSCOM Showcase of Emerging Product Companies[Nasscom_Emerge_50]
 iViZ, a Global Security Challenge(GSC) Semi-Finalist 2007 Raises $2.5m - Bringing Total of GSC Alumni to over $37 million
 The Nasscom Emerge 50 listing announced..
 India's hottest start-ups

External links
 
 Cigital acquires iViZ security
 Best ever security services

Computer security software companies
Software companies of India
Indian companies established in 2005
Companies based in Boston